Sappho  was launched in 1810 in Sunderland. She traded widely, first as a West Indiaman and later to the Baltic. She also made one voyage to India, sailing under a licence from the British East India Company (EIC). She stranded on 9 July 1823, was gotten off, condemned, and sold. She was wrecked in 1833.

Career
Sappho first appeared in Lloyd's Register (LR) in 1810.
 

On 31 March 1810 Captain Charles Spencer Compton acquired a letter of marque.

Captain William Cranitch acquired a letter of marque on 5 December 1811.

In 1813 the EIC had lost its monopoly on the trade between India and Britain. British ships were then free to sail to India or the Indian Ocean under a licence from the EIC.

On 30 March 1817 Sappho, W.Grice, master, sailed for Bombay, under a license from the EIC.

Fate
On 9 July 1833 Sappho, Duncan, master, was on her way from Savannah to Saint John, New Brunswick, when she  stranded on "the Wolves" (the Wolves Archipelago, at the entrance to the Bay of Fundy). The crew was saved. Sappho and her cargo were to be sold at Saint Andrews, New Brunswick.

Citations and references
Citations

Reference
 

1810 ships
Age of Sail merchant ships of England
Maritime incidents in July 1833